Sheldon Bateau (born 29 January 1991) is a Trinidadian professional footballer who plays as a central defender for Belgian club Beveren on loan from Turkish club Samsunspor. Bateau also represents the Trinidad and Tobago national team.

Bateau began his professional football career in 2009, at the age of 18, with San Juan Jabloteh in his native Trinidad and Tobago. After three seasons with the San Juan Kings, Bateau made a switch to fellow Pro League club North East Stars. However, Bateau later made a transfer after one month to K.V. Mechelen of the Belgian Pro League prior to the 2012–13 season.

Club career

Early career
Bateau spent his early career in his native Trinidad and Tobago with San Juan Jabloteh of the TT Pro League. In his three seasons with the San Juan Kings, Bateau appeared in 16 matches and scored four goals. However, after the club dissolved due to financial difficulties following the 2011–12 season, Bateau switched to North East Stars. In August 2012, before playing a match for his new club, Bateau received a trial with FC Twente of the Eredivisie. Since Bateau is not a European Union player, his salary became a block for a transfer to the Eredivisie club.

KV Mechelen
On 13 September 2012, Bateau signed a one-year contract with an option for two additional years with K.V. Mechelen of the Belgian Pro League. Sheldon made his league debut on 6 October coming on as a substitute in the 59th minute in a 0–2 defeat to Kortrijk. On 31 October, Sheldon made his first start for the club against OH Leuven that resulted in a 1–3 loss. Afterwards, Bateau solidified a place in the starting line-up as a centre back and appeared in 11 league matches, including five consecutive starts, prior to the 2012–13 winter break. His consistent form resulted in Sheldon signing a two-year contract extension, on 18 January 2013, keeping him at Mechelen until the end of the 2014–15 season. On 27 April, Bateau scored his first two league goals during a play-off match against Waasland-Beveren that provided his club a vital 2–0 win. Bateau concluded his first season in Belgium with 22 league appearances and two goals.

Sheldon started the 2013–14 season as a regular in defence for Mechelen.

Kairat
On 27 June 2017, Bateau signed for Kazakhstan Premier League side FC Kairat on loan for the remainder of Kairat's 2017 season. On 29 December 2017, Krylia Sovetov Samara announced that they had agreed to extend Bateau's loan to Kairat for an additional year.

Sarpsborg 08
On 14 February 2019, Sarpsborg 08 announced that they had signed Bateau for the 2019 season.

Samsunspor
On 9 January 2022, Bateau signed a 2.5-year contract with Samsunspor in Turkey.

SK Beveren

On 12 August 2022, Bateau joined S.K. Beveren on a one-year loan. He made his debut on the next day against Beerschot, coming off in the 75th minute for Derrick Tshimanga.

International career
Bateau has been capped at under-17, under-20, under-23 Olympic team, and the Trinidad and Tobago national team.

Bateau made his debut for the Trinidad and Tobago national team on 6 February 2013 in a match against Peru playing the entire match which ended in a 0–2 loss for the Soca Warriors. On 5 September, Bateau made a substitute appearance in a 3–3 draw against the United Arab Emirates. In the following match, Bateau started and led the Soca Warriors to a 3–1 win over Saudi Arabia to claim third place in the 2013 OSN Cup. Sheldon continued as a starter in Stephen Hart's back-line during the next two international matches against New Zealand and Jamaica.

On 4 June 2014, Bateau started in a 3–0 loss during a send-off series match for Argentina at Estadio Monumental prior to the 2014 FIFA World Cup. Four days later, Bateau made an additional start in centre defence before being replaced by Gavin Hoyte in the 72nd minute for the Soca Warriors in a 2–0 loss to Iran in Arena Corinthians.

Career statistics

Club

International
Updated 25 March 2021

International goals
Scores and results list Trinidad and Tobago's goal tally first.

References

External links

 
 
 Sheldon Bateau at Footballdatabase

1991 births
Sportspeople from Port of Spain
Living people
Association football central defenders
Trinidad and Tobago footballers
Trinidad and Tobago expatriate footballers
Trinidad and Tobago international footballers
Trinidad and Tobago youth international footballers
Trinidad and Tobago under-20 international footballers
San Juan Jabloteh F.C. players
K.V. Mechelen players
PFC Krylia Sovetov Samara players
FC Kairat players
Sarpsborg 08 FF players
Samsunspor footballers
TT Pro League players
Belgian Pro League players
Russian Premier League players
Kazakhstan Premier League players
Eliteserien players
TFF First League players
2015 CONCACAF Gold Cup players
Expatriate footballers in Belgium
Expatriate footballers in Russia
Expatriate footballers in Kazakhstan
Expatriate footballers in Norway
Expatriate footballers in Turkey
Trinidad and Tobago expatriate sportspeople in Belgium
Trinidad and Tobago expatriate sportspeople in Russia
Trinidad and Tobago expatriate sportspeople in Kazakhstan
Trinidad and Tobago expatriate sportspeople in Norway
Trinidad and Tobago expatriate sportspeople in Turkey